Maybelle Blair (born January 16, 1927) is a former All-American Girls Professional Baseball League player.

Born in Inglewood, California, Blair was an efficient pitcher when she joined the league with the Peoria Redwings in its 1948 season, even though she appeared in only one game for the team, and then moved the next year to a professional softball league in Chicago to play for the Chicago Cardinals. Later, she played for the Jax Girls softball club of New Orleans.

Afterwards, Blair attended Compton Junior College in California and then Los Angeles School of Physiotherapy. Following her graduation, she worked at a treatment center in Los Angeles before began a long 37-year career at Northrop Corporation, where she started as a chauffeur and ended up as the manager of highway transportation, being one of the three female managers the company employed in that period.

Following her retirement, Blair became vice president of Center for Extended Learning for Seniors (CELS); an educational travel tours program provider for Elderhostel.

Blair also became an active collaborator in different projects of the AAGPBL Players Association since its foundation in 1982, serving on the Board of Directors and the Chair of the Fundraising Committee. The association helped to bring the league story to the public eye and was largely responsible for the opening of Women in Baseball, a permanent display based at the Baseball Hall of Fame and Museum, which was unveiled in 1988 to honor the entire All-American Girls Professional Baseball League rather than any individual personality.

In 2022, Blair publicly came out as a lesbian while promoting the TV series A League of Their Own, saying that prior to her time in the AAGPBL, “I thought I was the only one in the world… I hid for 75, 85 years and this is actually, basically, the first time I’ve ever come out.”

Sources

1927 births
Living people
All-American Girls Professional Baseball League players
Peoria Redwings players
El Camino College Compton Center alumni
Softball players from California
Baseball players from Inglewood, California
Lesbian sportswomen
LGBT baseball players
American LGBT sportspeople